Ferociously Stoned is the debut album by American band the Cherry Poppin' Daddies, released in November 1990 on Sub Par Records. It was subsequently re-released on the Daddies' own independent label Space Age Bachelor Pad Records in 1994.

Composition
Mixing thumping bass and heavy brass, Ferociously Stoned draws heavily from the punk rock and funk influences which dominated the Daddies' early music, though also features a prominent streak of the jazz and swing-inspired sounds which would soon become a hallmark of the band's style. While the album is driven primarily by funk and swing, Ferociously Stoned also features experiments in psychedelic pop ("The Lifeboat Mutiny"), disco ("Suicide Kings") and James Brown-style rhythm and blues ("You Better Move").

Release and reception
Following the success of the Daddies' 1989 demo tape 4 From On High which helped build the band a dedicated local cult following, Ferociously Stoned set a near-record for all-time advance sales in Eugene, Oregon's record stores, coming in second only to R.E.M. Upon release, the album became a regional success, remaining for over a year on The Rockets Northwest Top Twenty list and receiving favorable reviews in The Oregonian and Alternative Press. At one point, the Daddies were planning an animated music video for the song "Teenage Brainsurgeon", though ultimately scrapped the idea due to production costs.

Ferociously Stoned  was originally released on vinyl and CD by independent label Sub Par Records, the vinyl cover depicting three bikini-clad women clutching stones against a backwards American flag, and the subsequent CD release featuring only the band's name with censor bars over the words "Cherry" and "Poppin'". In March 1991, when the Daddies had temporarily shortened their name to "The Daddies" to alleviate the controversy surrounding their name, the album was re-released with the shortened band name and new cover art featuring a skeleton in formal wear, modeled after the Grateful Deads "Uncle Sam" skeleton. In 1994, coinciding with the release of the Daddies' second album, Rapid City Muscle Car, Ferociously Stoned was re-issued on CD, restoring the band's full name and including the tracks from their 1989 demo tape 4 From On High as bonus content.

Track listing
All songs written and composed by Steve Perry (MC Large Drink).

Personnel 
 Cherry Poppin' Daddies
M.C. Large Drink (Steve Perry) – vocals
John Fohl – guitar
Dan Schmid – bass
Brian West – drums
Chris Azorr – keyboards
Brooks Brown – alto saxophone
James Phillips – tenor saxophone
Dana Heitman – trumpet

Additional musicians
Tim Arnold – drums on tracks 12 – 15
James Gossard – guitar on tracks 12 – 15

 Production
Produced and arranged by the Cherry Poppin' Daddies and Bill Barnett
Engineered by Bill Barnett and Michael Edwards
Mixed at Gung Ho Studios by Bill Barnett, except "Dirty Mutha Fuzz", mixed by Michael Edwards
Mastered by Bill Barnett

References

Cherry Poppin' Daddies albums
1990 debut albums